Hanns Cibulka (20 September 1920, in Jägerndorf, Czechoslovakia – 20 June 2004, in Gotha, Germany) was a German poet and diarist.

Works 
 1954 Märzlicht. Gedichte
 1959 Zwei Silben. Gedichte
 1960 Sizilianisches Tagebuch
 1962 Arioso. Gedichte
 1963 Umbrische Tage
 1968 Windrose. Gedichte
 1971 Sanddornzeit. Tagebuchblätter von Hiddensee
 1972 Dornburger Blätter. Briefe und Aufzeichnungen
 1973 Lichtschwalben. Gedichte
 1974 Liebeserklärung in K. Tagebuchaufzeichnungen
 1977 Lebensbaum. Gedichte
 1978 Das Buch Ruth. Aus den Aufzeichnungen des Archäologen Michael S.
 1980 Der Rebstock. Gedichte
 1982 Swantow. Die Aufzeichnungen des Andreas Flemming
 1982 Gedichte
 1984 Seit ein Gespräch wir sind / E noi siamo dialogo. Gedichte/Poesie
 1985 Seedorn. Tagebucherzählung
 1986 Losgesprochen. Gedichte aus 3 Jahrzehnten
 1988 Wegscheide. Tagebucherzählung
 1991 Ostseetagebücher
 1992 Dornburger Blätter
 1993 Thüringer Tagebücher
 1994 Am Brückenwehr. Zwischen Kindheit und Wende
 1996 Die Heimkehr der verratenen Söhne. Tagebucherzählung
 1998 Tagebuch einer späten Liebe.
 2000 Sonnenflecken über Pisa
 2004 Späte Jahre
 2005 Jedes Wort ein Flügelschlag (edited by Günter Gerstmann)
 2005 Die blaue Farbe des Windes (ausgewählte Lyrik u. Prosa). Kunstband mit farbigen Zeichnungen Gudrun Kraft-Methfessel (Hg.) – Jena: Glaux. (Vertrieb) – 

German diarists
Silesian-German people
People from Krnov
1920 births
2004 deaths
Sudeten German people
German military personnel of World War II
German male poets
20th-century German poets
German-language poets
20th-century German male writers
German male non-fiction writers
20th-century diarists